This article lists those who were potential candidates for the Democratic nomination for Vice President of the United States in the 1968 election. After winning the Democratic presidential nomination at the 1968 Democratic National Convention, incumbent Vice President Hubert Humphrey asked the convention to nominate Maine Senator Edmund Muskie as his running mate. The convention overwhelmingly voted to ratify the choice of Muskie, though Julian Bond picked up a scattering of votes. Muskie was surprised by the selection, as he was from a Northeastern state with few electoral votes. Humphrey almost chose Oklahoma Senator Fred R. Harris, but Humphrey decided that Muskie's age, governmental experience, and quiet temperament made him the better candidate. The Humphrey–Muskie ticket ultimately lost to the Nixon–Agnew ticket in the 1968 election. Muskie's place on the national ticket helped make him an early front-runner for the 1972 Democratic presidential nomination, though Muskie ultimately dropped out of the contest.

Potential running mates

Finalists 
Maine Senator Edmund Muskie
San Francisco Mayor Joseph Alioto
Oklahoma Senator Fred R. Harris
New Jersey Governor Richard J. Hughes
Former Deputy Secretary of Defense Cyrus Vance

Declined
Massachusetts Senator Ted Kennedy
Republican Governor Nelson Rockefeller of New York

Others
Former North Carolina Governor Terry Sanford
Ambassador Sargent Shriver
Hawaii Senator Daniel Inouye

Results

Source: Keating Holland, "All the Votes... Really," CNN

See also
1968 Democratic National Convention
Democratic Party presidential primaries, 1968

References

Vice presidency of the United States
1968 United States presidential election
Hubert Humphrey
Ted Kennedy
Nelson A. Rockefeller